Julian Borger is a British journalist and non-fiction writer. He is the world affairs editor at The Guardian.

Career 
Borger was a correspondent in the United States, Eastern Europe, the Middle East and the Balkans and covered the Bosnian War for the BBC.

In his reporting, Borger covered the Bush administration military spending and Iraq policy. In the 2010s, he wrote about Iran.

Borger is a contributor to the Center on International Cooperation. 

His 2016 book, The Butcher's Trail, was reviewed by The Independent, The National, and The Wall Street Journal.

Works

References

Year of birth missing (living people)
Place of birth missing (living people)
Living people
20th-century British journalists
21st-century English non-fiction writers
21st-century British journalists
English male journalists
English newspaper editors
The Guardian journalists